Raiders from Beneath the Sea is a 1964 American adventure film directed by Maury Dexter and starring Ken Scott and Merry Anders.

Plot
A down-on-his-luck California apartment house manager hatches a plan to rob a Catalina Island bank—and escape with his accomplices using scuba gear.

Cast
 Ken Scott as Bill Harper
 Merry Anders as Dottie Harper
 Russ Bender as Tucker
 Booth Colman as Purdy
 Garth Benton as Buddy
 Bruce Anson as Policeman #1
 Walter Maslow as Policeman #2
 Stacey Winters as Bank Teller
 Ray Dannis as Bowman
 Larry Barton as Bank Manager
 Roger Creed as Bank Guard

References

External links 
 
 
 
 
Review of film at Cinema Sentries

1964 films
American black-and-white films
1964 drama films
1960s English-language films
Films directed by Maury Dexter